Patrik Marcel (born November 27, 1994) is a Czech professional ice hockey player. He is currently playing for HC Litoměřice of the CHANCE Liga.

Marcel made his Czech Extraliga debut playing with HC Plzeň during the 2013–14 Czech Extraliga season.

References

External links

1994 births
Living people
HC Plzeň players
Czech ice hockey defencemen
Sportspeople from Plzeň
Stadion Hradec Králové players
HC Stadion Litoměřice players